The Atkins–Carter House, at 314 E. Madison St. in Louisa in Lawrence County, Kentucky, was built in 1890.  It was listed on the National Register of Historic Places in 1988.

It is Queen Anne in style, and also has been known as the Sarah E. Atkins House.

It was deemed notable as the "best interpretation of the Queen Anne style in Louisa and probably the entire county."

References

National Register of Historic Places in Lawrence County, Kentucky
Queen Anne architecture in Kentucky
Houses completed in 1890
1890 establishments in Kentucky
Houses on the National Register of Historic Places in Kentucky
Louisa, Kentucky